Cumberland is a city in Cass County, Iowa, United States that was founded in 1884. The population was 251 at the time of the 2020 census.  Cumberland's sister community is Massena, Iowa.

Geography
Cumberland is located at  (41.273650, -94.871180).

Demographics

2010 census
As of the census of 2010, there were 262 people, 116 households, and 66 families living in the city. The racial makeup of the city was 98.9% White, 0.4% Native American, 0.4% Pacific Islander, and 0.4% from two or more races. Hispanic or Latino of any race were 0.4% of the population.

There were 116 households, of which 27.6% had children under the age of 18 living with them, 44.0% were married couples living together, 6.9% had a female householder with no husband present, 6.0% had a male householder with no wife present, and 43.1% were non-families. 37.9% of all households were made up of individuals, and 16.3% had someone living alone who was 65 years of age or older. The average household size was 2.26 and the average family size was 2.94.

The median age in the city was 41.6 years. 25.2% of residents were under the age of 18; 6.8% were between the ages of 18 and 24; 21.4% were from 25 to 44; 28.6% were from 45 to 64; and 17.9% were 65 years of age or older. The gender makeup of the city was 50.4% male and 49.6% female.

2000 census
As of the census of 2000, there were 281 people, 128 households, and 82 families living in the city. The racial makeup of the city was 99.29% White, 0.36% Native American, and 0.36% from two or more races.

There were 128 households, out of which 25.0% had children under the age of 18 living with them, 59.4% were married couples living together, 3.9% had a female householder with no husband present, and 35.2% were non-families. 34.4% of all households were made up of individuals, and 17.2% had someone living alone who was 65 years of age or older. The average household size was 2.20 and the average family size was 2.81.

In the city, the population was spread out, with 21.0% under the age of 18, 4.6% from 18 to 24, 25.6% from 25 to 44, 24.9% from 45 to 64, and 23.8% who were 65 years of age or older. The median age was 44 years. For every 100 females, there were 100.7 males. For every 100 females age 18 and over, there were 100.0 males.

The median income for a household in the city was $28,750, and the median income for a family was $39,167. Males had a median income of $26,786 versus $15,500 for females. The per capita income for the city was $15,662. About 6.1% of families and 8.3% of the population were below the poverty line, including 10.4% of those under the age of eighteen and 6.3% of those 65 or over.

Education
Cumberland is within the CAM Community School District.

It was a part of the C & M Community School District, until July 1, 2011, when it merged into CAM.

Local Cuisine

In honor of Cumberland's centennial celebration in 1984, local residents compiled and distributed copies of a cookbook containing a collection of their favorite recipes.  There was a wide array of different types of cuisine represented in the recipes but they largely consisted of dishes common in mid-western American country cooking that typically included meat-based main dishes, vegetable-based side dishes, and sugary and/or fruity baked goods for dessert dishes.  One such recipe for Ham Balls received particularly high acclaim from several former residents.

References

External links
 City of Cumberland Website
 CAM High School Website
 CAM Middle School Website

Cities in Cass County, Iowa
Cities in Iowa